Vladimir Vasilyevich Andreyev (born September 7, 1966 in Yamanchurino, Chuvashia) is a Russian race walker.

Achievements

See also
List of doping cases in athletics

References

1966 births
Living people
People from Yalchiksky District
Sportspeople from Chuvashia
Russian male racewalkers
Olympic male racewalkers
Olympic athletes of Russia
Olympic athletes of the Unified Team
Olympic bronze medalists for Russia
Olympic bronze medalists in athletics (track and field)
Athletes (track and field) at the 1992 Summer Olympics
Athletes (track and field) at the 2000 Summer Olympics
Athletes (track and field) at the 2004 Summer Olympics
Medalists at the 2000 Summer Olympics
World Athletics Championships athletes for Russia
European Athletics Championships medalists
Russian Athletics Championships winners
CIS Athletics Championships winners
Doping cases in athletics
Russian sportspeople in doping cases